Ritva Marjatta Kajosmaa (born 3 February 1938 in Vehkalahti) is a Finnish former cross-country skier who competed during the 1970s. She competed in two Winter Olympics, earning a total of four medals. Kajosmaa also competed several times at the Holmenkollen ski festival, winning four times at 10 km (1969, 1971–1973) and three times at 5 km (1969, 1972-1973). Additionally, she won two medals at the 1970 FIS Nordic World Ski Championships with a silver in the 10 km, and a bronze in 3 × 5 km relay.

For her successes in Nordic skiing and at the Holmenkollen, Kajosmaa received the Holmenkollen medal in 1971 (Shared with Berit Mørdre Lammedal and Reidar Hjermstad.). She was the first Finnish woman to ever win the Holmenkollen medal.


Cross-country skiing results
All results are sourced from the International Ski Federation (FIS).

Olympic Games
 4 medals – (3 silver, 1 bronze)

World Championships
 2 medals – (1 silver, 1 bronze)

Sources
Holmenkollen medalists – click Holmenkollmedaljen for downloadable PDF file 
Holmenkollen winners since 1892 – click Vinnere for downloadable PDF file

Notes

External links

1938 births
Living people
People from Hamina
Cross-country skiers at the 1968 Winter Olympics
Cross-country skiers at the 1972 Winter Olympics
Cross-country skiers at the 1976 Winter Olympics
Finnish female cross-country skiers
Holmenkollen medalists
Holmenkollen Ski Festival winners
Olympic cross-country skiers of Finland
Olympic medalists in cross-country skiing
FIS Nordic World Ski Championships medalists in cross-country skiing
Medalists at the 1976 Winter Olympics
Medalists at the 1972 Winter Olympics
Olympic silver medalists for Finland
Olympic bronze medalists for Finland
Sportspeople from Kymenlaakso
20th-century Finnish women